Ivan Alekseyevich Rodin (born 14 April 1987) is a Russian former professional football player.

Club career
He played two seasons in the Russian Football National League for FC Torpedo Moscow.

He played for Dinaburg FC in the 2007 UEFA Intertoto Cup.

External links
 
 Career summary by sportbox.ru
 

1987 births
People from Lyudinovsky District
Living people
Russian footballers
Association football midfielders
Dinaburg FC players
FC Lokomotiv Kaluga players
FC Vityaz Podolsk players
FC Torpedo Moscow players
FC Tambov players
FC Solyaris Moscow players
Latvian Higher League players
Russian expatriate footballers
Expatriate footballers in Latvia
Russian expatriate sportspeople in Latvia
Sportspeople from Kaluga Oblast